Bozüyük is a city in Bilecik Province in the Marmara region of Turkey. It is the seat of Bozüyük District. Its population is 71,806 (2021), making it the second most populous municipality in the province after Bilecik. Bozüyük depends economically on Eskişehir. The town is 32 km away from Bilecik and 45 km away from Eskişehir. It consists of 10 quarters: Çarşı, Kasımpaşa, Tekke, Yeni, Yediler, 4 Eylül, Yeşilkent, Içköy, Akpınar and Yenidoğan.

References

Populated places in Bilecik Province
Bozüyük District
Towns in Turkey